is a 2012 Japanese television series. It features actor Etsushi Toyokawa and Mana Ashida as Keisuke and Miu respectively, a father and daughter pair. Keisuke was suddenly diagnosed with Early-onset Alzheimer's disease, which drastically affected their family's life.

Kazoku no Uta was aired from 1 July 2012 as part of Fuji Television's Dramatic Sunday time slot, which airs every Sunday from 9pm to 9:54pm.

Cast
 Etsushi Toyokawa as Keisuke Kinoshita
 Mana Ashida as Miu Kinoshita
 Shohei Miura as Akio Katsuta
 Denden as Kiyoshi Muneta
 Ken Yasuda as Yutaka Koga
 Sayuri Kokusho as Serai Takagi
 Haruko Arai as Kotaro Arai
 Asaya Kimijima as Kenta Tachibana
 Riko Yoshida as Nako Matsuyama
 Mitsuko Oka as Chieko Nakamura
 Keizo Kanie as Tomio Nakamura
 Miki Nakatani as Akane Nishiwaki

Episodes

References

External links
  
 Beautiful Rain on Facebook 
 

Japanese drama television series
2012 Japanese television series debuts
2012 Japanese television series endings
Fuji TV dramas